George Bennett (12 February 1829 – 16 August 1886), sometimes known as Farmer Bennett, was an English professional cricketer, who played first-class cricket from 1853 to 1873.  He was mainly associated with Kent County Cricket Club, and made more than 150 appearances in first-class matches.

Life and career
Bennett was born in Shorne Ridgeway near Gravesend, Kent, where he was employed as a bricklayer and for 25 years at Cobham Hall by John Bligh, 6th Earl of Darnley as a cricket coach for his sons, including Edward and Ivo both of whom went on to play for Kent. He was a right-handed batsman and a right-arm slow roundarm bowler who played in 126 matches for Kent. He played for several of the representative travelling teams including the United All-England Eleven (1860–1862); All-England Eleven (1864) and the United South of England Eleven (1872).  He represented the Players in 1865 and 1866. He was described by Lord Harris in 1907 in the History of Kent County Cricket as "one of the best all rounders Kent has produced".

Bennett took part in the first English tour of Australia as a member of HH Stephenson's XI in Australia in 1861–62. The team travelled to Australia on the SS Great Britain. During the voyage, while the team was practising on deck, one passenger received a broken nose and cut cheek when he was struck in the face by a belaying pin which Bennett was using as an improvised cricket bat. In the only first-class match on the tour, playing for "The World" against a "Surrey XI" at the Melbourne Cricket Ground in March 1862, Bennett took seven wickets in each innings and made 72 in the first innings.

He was the first player to be ever given out handled the ball. In a match for Kent against Sussex at the County Cricket Ground, Hove, in August 1872, he removed a ball that had become lodged in his clothing, and was given out before he had scored a run.

Notes

References

Sources
 Arthur Haygarth, Scores & Biographies, several volumes, Lillywhite, 1862–72
 Wisden Cricketers' Almanack, several volumes to 1874

External links
 

1829 births
1886 deaths
People from Shorne
English cricketers
English cricketers of 1826 to 1863
Kent cricketers
North of the Thames v South of the Thames cricketers
Players cricketers
Players of the South cricketers
North v South cricketers
All-England Eleven cricketers
United South of England Eleven cricketers